Flavius Josephus Carpenter (March 24, 1851, in Franklin County, Georgia – August 2, 1933, at home in Arkadelphia, Clark County, Arkansas), was an American Civil War veteran, steamboat captain, U.S. Marshal, and entrepreneurial businessman.

He selected sites for two Arkansas Power & Light (now Entergy Arkansas, a subsidiary of Entergy) dams on the upper Ouachita River: Remmel Dam, which created Lake Catherine, and Carpenter Dam), which created Lake Hamilton in 1931. Carpenter Dam was named for him.  Lake Hamilton and Lake Catherine in Hot Spring County, Arkansas now sit upstream and downstream of Carpenter Dam.

Early life
He married on June 2, 1877, in Clark County, Arkansas, to Jane Elizabeth Wallis, who was born in August 1857 in Missouri; they were the parents of eight children.

References

1851 births
1933 deaths
Hot Spring County, Arkansas